Alice Mary Boase  (23 March 1910 – 1999) was a Ugandan politician. She and Barbara Saben were appointed to the Legislative Council in 1954, becoming its first female members.

Biography
Boase was born 23 March 1910 in Dublin. When she was two her parents moved to Nyasaland, after her father Charles had been appointed as a magistrate. The family moved to Uganda when Charles was appointed Chief Justice in 1921. In 1929 Alice married the physician Arthur Boase (1901–1986); the couple went on to have ten children.

She served as president of the Uganda Council of Women from 1953 to 1955, and sat on the board of the Uganda Club. Boase and her husband both became members of Kampala municipal council. In 1954 Boase and Barbara Saben were appointed to the Legislative Council, becoming its first female members. She left Uganda in 1956 when Arthur began working at Saint John Eye Hospital in Jerusalem. In 1969 they retired to Sussex in the United Kingdom. Boase died in Haywards Heath in 1999.

Her brother John had been appointed Chief Justice of Uganda in 1952, and became Speaker of the Legislative Council in 1958. In 2004 Boase's memoir, When The Sun Never Set – A Family's Life In The British Empire, was published.

References

1910 births
Members of the Order of the British Empire
20th-century Ugandan women politicians
20th-century Ugandan politicians
Members of the Parliament of Uganda
1999 deaths
British expatriates in Malawi
British expatriates in Uganda